Caren Zeldie Turner (born 1957) is a former United States Democratic lobbyist and formerly served as one of several unpaid commissioners for the Port Authority of New York and New Jersey. She resigned from her position in 2018 after a video showed her berating and attempting to influence police officers at a traffic stop and announcing she was a "friend of the mayor."

Early life and education

Turner was born in 1957 to Bernard and Joyce Turner. Her father was an attorney who served on the Board of Education in Cresskill, New Jersey, and she has one sibling, a brother, Stuart Turner. Turner is from New Jersey and received her juris doctor from Georgetown Law, where she served as an editor of the school's Law and Policy in International Business law journal. She received a bachelor's degree from Brandeis University where she majored in both political science and Spanish. She also received an executive MBA from Rutgers University. Turner has sat on the Georgetown Law Alumni Board.

Career

The former commissioner is also a political consultant and the founder and CEO of Turner Government & Public Affairs, a government affairs firm. As a political consultant she has worked for companies that manufacture parts for Lockheed Martin fighter jets. She was an attorney with Potomac Law Group and a former adjunct professor at George Washington University’s Graduate School of Political Management.

Turner served on the finance committees for Jon Corzine and Hillary Clinton. She was a co-chair of the Financial Committee for Ready for Hillary, a super political action committee created to draft Clinton for the 2016 United States Presidential Election.

Turner has been featured on Fox Business as a correspondent on Washington lobbying, and wrote articles for The Huffington Post. She has appeared on television channels such as Fox Business Network as a government lobbyist expert.

In March 2017, Turner began a six-year unpaid term on the Board of Commissioners of the Port Authority of New York and New Jersey, after New Jersey Senate Majority Leader Loretta Weinberg recommended her, Governor Chris Christie nominated her, and the New Jersey State Senate approved.

Traffic stop incident
In 2018, Turner was heavily criticized for her behavior at a traffic stop by police in Tenafly, New Jersey. Police had stopped a vehicle that contained Turner's adult daughter, who had been traveling with friends. After police discovered the vehicle's registration was two years out of date and the driver did not have an insurance card, they moved to impound it. Turner arrived soon after to pick up her daughter and the other occupants of the impounded car and repeatedly demanded to know the reason for the traffic stop, telling the officers that she was a "friend of the mayor", that they could "not put a sentence together", demanding they address her by the title "commissioner", and stating that they had ruined the holiday of "Ph.D. students from MIT and Yale." She said she would be "talking to ... the mayor", and then launched into a tirade which climaxed in Turner ordering one of the police officers to "shut the fuck up."

New Jersey police released videotape of the interaction which quickly went viral on YouTube. The incident was nationally reported by CBS News, CNBC, and The New York Times, among others. Intense criticism of Turner followed, with the New Jersey Star Ledger writing that she was "unencumbered by clue" [sic] while a commentator for the Today Show described her as having "all the tact and manners of a zoo animal at feeding time." Some came to Turner's defense, including lawyer Donald Scarinci, who questioned the swift condemnation of Turner.

She resigned from the Port Authority a week after the video emerged.

Following Turner's resignation, Port Authority chair Kevin O'Toole issued an official apology to the Tenafly police officers involved in the incident. Turner was given an official censure by the Port Authority, which described her behavior as "outrageous and profoundly disturbing."  In the earlier statement of apology released by Turner, she had asserted that her actions did not constitute a violation of the code of ethics. Nevertheless, six months following the incident, as part of a consent order in which Turner acknowledged her actions could be seen as her seeking a special benefit, she was fined $1,500 by the Ethics Commission.

Legacy
The Record named the traffic stop one of North Jersey's twelve "biggest moments of 2018." Turner's actions at the traffic stop led to the introduction of legislation in New Jersey to eliminate law enforcement-style badges being issued to politicians, with Senator Vin Gopal saying the incident had demonstrated that the badges could be used "for the abuse of power."

Since the incident, according to The Daily Dot, Turner has "faded into the woodwork".

References

External links
 Video of Turner's interaction with Tenafly police

American lobbyists
Living people
Place of birth missing (living people)
New Jersey Democrats
People from Tenafly, New Jersey
Port Authority of New York and New Jersey people
1957 births
Georgetown University Law Center alumni